The 1st annual Venice International Film Festival was held between 6 and 21 August 1932. Dr. Jekyll and Mr. Hyde was the first film to be screened at the festival. No official prizes were awarded, so an audience referendum took place to determine the winners.

Awards
 Most Favorite Actor: Fredric March for Dr. Jekyll and Mr. Hyde
 Most Favorite Actress: Helen Hayes for The Sin of Madelon Claudet
 Most Convincing Director: Nikolai Ekk for Putyovka v zhizn
 Best Technical Perfection: Leontine Sagan for Mädchen in Uniform
 Most Original Story (Fantasy): Rouben Mamoulian for Dr. Jekyll and Mr. Hyde
 Most Amusing Film: René Clair for À nous la liberté
 Most Touching Film: Edgar Selwyn for The Sin of Madelon Claudet

References

External links 

Venice Film Festival 1932 Awards on IMDb

V
Venice Film Festival
1932 film festivals
Film
August 1932 events